The 2013 WNBA season is the 17th season for the Phoenix Mercury of the Women's National Basketball Association.

There were high hopes for the Mercury after they drafted Brittney Griner first overall in the 2013 WNBA Draft. However, the Mercury got off to a slow start, and ultimately fired coach Corey Gaines on August 8, 2013, replacing him with Russ Pennell. Amber Cox, the Mercury President and CEO, took over Gaines' GM duties. Pennell helped turn things around, securing the third seed in the 2013 WNBA Playoffs. The Mercury earned a spot in the Western Conference finals against the Minnesota Lynx.

Transactions

WNBA Draft
The following are the Mercury's selections in the 2013 WNBA Draft.

Transaction log
February 8: re-signed Krystal Thomas and Lynetta Kizer.
March 7: signed Ify Ibekwe and Jalana Childs.
April 11: re-signed DeWanna Bonner.

Trades

Personnel changes

Additions

Subtractions

Roster

Depth

Season standings

Schedule

Preseason

|- style="background:#cfc;"
		 | 1 
		 | May 19
		 |  Japan
		 | 
		 | Brittney Griner (18)
		 | Dupree & Kizer (9)
		 | Samantha Prahalis (8)
		 | US Airways Center4021
		 | 1–0

Regular season

|- style="background:#fcc;"
		 | 1 
		 | May 27
		 |  Chicago
		 | 
		 | Diana Taurasi (18)
		 | Brittney Griner (8)
		 | Samantha Prahalis (5)
		 | US Airways Center10200
		 | 0–1

|- style="background:#fcc;"
		 | 2 
		 | June 2
		 | @ Seattle
		 | 
		 | Candice Dupree (18)
		 | Brittney Griner (7)
		 | Charde Houston (6)
		 | Key Arena9686
		 | 0–2
|- style="background:#fcc;"
		 | 3 
		 | June 6
		 | @ Minnesota
		 | 
		 | Diana Taurasi (21)
		 | DeWanna Bonner (7)
		 | Samantha Prahalis (5)
		 | Target Center8511
		 | 0–3
|- style="background:#cfc;"
		 | 4 
		 | June 8
		 | @ Indiana
		 | 
		 | Diana Taurasi (26)
		 | DeWanna Bonner (11)
		 | Bonner, Dupree, & Taurasi (5)
		 | Bankers Life Fieldhouse8672
		 | 1–3
|- style="background:#cfc;"
		 | 5 
		 | June 14
		 |  Los Angeles
		 | 
		 | Diana Taurasi (34)
		 | DeWanna Bonner (12)
		 | Diana Taurasi (7)
		 | US Airways Center13065
		 | 2–3
|- style="background:#cfc;"
		 | 6 
		 | June 16
		 | @ Tulsa
		 | 
		 | Diana Taurasi (29)
		 | Candice Dupree (10)
		 | Diana Taurasi (9)
		 | BOK Center4206
		 | 3–3
|- style="background:#fcc;"
		 | 7 
		 | June 19
		 |  Minnesota
		 | 
		 | Diana Taurasi (28)
		 | Brittney Griner (7)
		 | DeWanna Bonner (5)
		 | US Airways Center8464
		 | 3–4
|- style="background:#cfc;"
		 | 8 
		 | June 21
		 |  Washington
		 | 
		 | Diana Taurasi (31)
		 | DeWanna Bonner (9)
		 | Diana Taurasi (5)
		 | US Airways Center9636
		 | 4–4
|- style="background:#cfc;"
		 | 9 
		 | June 25
		 | @ San Antonio
		 | 
		 | Brittney Griner (26)
		 | Candice Dupree (12)
		 | Diana Taurasi (8)
		 | AT&T Center9007
		 | 5–4
|- style="background:#cfc;"
		 | 10 
		 | June 27
		 | @ Washington
		 | 
		 | Diana Taurasi (26)
		 | Candice Dupree (11)
		 | Diana Taurasi (8)
		 | Verizon Center7950
		 | 6–4
|- style="background:#cfc;"
		 | 11 
		 | June 29
		 | @ Connecticut
		 | 
		 | Bonner & Taurasi (19)
		 | DeWanna Bonner (8)
		 | Diana Taurasi (5)
		 | Mohegan Sun Arena9110
		 | 7–4

|- style="background:#cfc;"
		 | 12 
		 | July 2
		 |  NY Liberty
		 | 
		 | Bonner & Dupree (20)
		 | Bonner & Dupree (7)
		 | Diana Taurasi (10)
		 | US Airways Center7636
		 | 8–4
|- style="background:#fcc;"
		 | 13 
		 | July 7
		 | @ Minnesota
		 | 
		 | Candice Dupree (12)
		 | Brittney Griner (11)
		 | Diana Taurasi (7)
		 | Target Center9104
		 | 8–5
|- style="background:#fcc;"
		 | 14 
		 | July 10
		 |  San Antonio
		 | 
		 | Candice Dupree (22)
		 | Krystal Thomas (6)
		 | Diana Taurasi (5)
		 | US Airways Center8707
		 | 8–6
|- style="background:#fcc;"
		 | 15 
		 | July 14
		 |  Los Angeles
		 | 
		 | Diana Taurasi (23)
		 | Candice Dupree (8)
		 | Diana Taurasi (5)
		 | US Airways Center8233
		 | 8–7
|- style="background:#cfc;"
		 | 16 
		 | July 18
		 | @ Los Angeles
		 | 
		 | Diana Taurasi (32)
		 | DeWanna Bonner (11)
		 | Diana Taurasi (6)
		 | Staples Center11105
		 | 9–7
|- style="background:#fcc;"
		 | 17 
		 | July 21
		 |  Minnesota
		 | 
		 | Diana Taurasi (26)
		 | DeWanna Bonner (10)
		 | Diana Taurasi (6)
		 | US Airways Center9806
		 | 9–8
|- style="background:#fcc;"
		 | 18 
		 | July 24
		 | @ Minnesota
		 | 
		 | Candice Dupree (17)
		 | Krystal Thomas (10)
		 | Alexis Hornbuckle (4)
		 | Target Center16404
		 | 9–9

|- align="center"
|colspan="9" bgcolor="#bbcaff"|All-Star Break
|- style="background:#fcc;"
		 | 19 
		 | August 1
		 | @ Seattle
		 | 
		 | DeWanna Bonner (19)
		 | Candice Dupree (10)
		 | DeWanna Bonner (7)
		 | Key Arena6457
		 | 9–10
|- style="background:#cfc;"
		 | 20 
		 | August 3
		 |  Atlanta
		 | 
		 | Diana Taurasi (28)
		 | DeWanna Bonner (6)
		 | Bonner, Dupree, & Taurasi (4)
		 | US Airways Center8138
		 | 10–10
|- style="background:#fcc;"
		 | 21 
		 | August 6
		 |  Seattle
		 | 
		 | Candice Dupree (18)
		 | Candice Dupree (8)
		 | Diana Taurasi (5)
		 | US Airways Center6877
		 | 10–11
|- style="background:#cfc;"
		 | 22 
		 | August 9
		 |  Tulsa
		 | 
		 | Diana Taurasi (23)
		 | Candice Dupree (9)
		 | Taurasi & Hornbuckle (4)
		 | US Airways Center8547
		 | 11–11
|- style="background:#cfc;"
		 | 23 
		 | August 11
		 |  Tulsa
		 | 
		 | DeWanna Bonner (21)
		 | Candice Dupree (7)
		 | Diana Taurasi (7)
		 | US Airways Center5972
		 | 12–11
|- style="background:#cfc;"
		 | 24 
		 | August 14
		 |  Indiana
		 | 
		 | Candice Dupree (16)
		 | Brittney Griner (8)
		 | Diana Taurasi (11)
		 | US Airways Center6135
		 | 13–11
|- style="background:#fcc;"
		 | 25 
		 | August 17
		 | @ San Antonio
		 | 
		 | Diana Taurasi (23)
		 | Briana Gilbreath (6)
		 | Diana Taurasi (7)
		 | AT&T Center10906
		 | 13–12
|- style="background:#cfc;"
		 | 26 
		 | August 20
		 | @ Tulsa
		 | 
		 | Diana Taurasi (28)
		 | Dupree & Griner (10)
		 | Diana Taurasi (10)
		 | BOK Center4261
		 | 14–12
|- style="background:#fcc;"
		 | 27 
		 | August 23
		 |  Seattle
		 | 
		 | DeWanna Bonner (20)
		 | Bonner & Griner (5)
		 | Diana Taurasi (7)
		 | US Airways Center8026
		 | 14–13
|- style="background:#cfc;"
		 | 28 
		 | August 31
		 |  Connecticut
		 | 
		 | Bonner & Dupree (22)
		 | Candice Dupree (9)
		 | Diana Taurasi (8)
		 | US Airways Center8119
		 | 15–13

|- style="background:#cfc;"
		 | 29 
		 | September 6
		 |  San Antonio
		 | 
		 | Diana Taurasi (21)
		 | Brittney Griner (14)
		 | Diana Taurasi (7)
		 | US Airways Center9006
		 | 16–13
|- style="background:#cfc;"
		 | 30 
		 | September 8
		 | @ Atlanta
		 | 
		 | Diana Taurasi (25)
		 | Brittney Griner (11)
		 | Diana Taurasi (6)
		 | Philips Arena9740
		 | 17–13
|- style="background:#cfc;"
		 | 31 
		 | September 10
		 | @ NY Liberty
		 | 
		 | Bonner & Dupree (18)
		 | Dupree & Taurasi (6)
		 | Diana Taurasi (9)
		 | Prudential Center8127
		 | 18–13
|- style="background:#fcc;"
		 | 32 
		 | September 11
		 | @ Chicago
		 | 
		 | Candice Dupree (15)
		 | Dupree & Gilbreath (6)
		 | Jasmine James (5)
		 | Allstate Arena6409
		 | 18–14
|- style="background:#cfc;"
		 | 33 
		 | September 13
		 |  San Antonio
		 | 
		 | Diana Taurasi (20)
		 | Krystal Thomas (8)
		 | Diana Taurasi (10)
		 | US Airways Center8899
		 | 19–14
|- style="background:#fcc;"
		 | 34 
		 | September 15
		 | @ Los Angeles
		 | 
		 | Griner & James (9)
		 | Krystal Thomas (8)
		 | Jasmine James (4)
		 | Staples Center12311
		 | 19–15

Playoffs

|- style="background:#cfc;"
		 | 1 
		 | September 19
		 | @ Los Angeles
		 | 
		 | Diana Taurasi (30)
		 | Candice Dupree (7)
		 | Diana Taurasi (7)
		 | Staples Center8500
		 | 1–0
|- style="background:#fcc;"
		 | 2 
		 | September 21
		 |  Los Angeles
		 | 
		 | Diana Taurasi (20)
		 | Candice Dupree (9)
		 | Diana Taurasi (5)
		 | US Airways Center11110
		 | 1–1
|- style="background:#cfc;"
		 | 3 
		 | September 23
		 | @ Los Angeles
		 | 
		 | Candice Dupree (22)
		 | Bonner & Gilbreath (6)
		 | Diana Taurasi (10)
		 | Staples Center9321
		 | 2–1

|- style="background:#fcc;"
		 | 1 
		 | September 26
		 | @ Minnesota
		 | 
		 | Diana Taurasi (15)
		 | Brittney Griner (6)
		 | Bonner & Dupree (3)
		 | Target Center9013
		 | 0–1
|- style="background:#fcc;"
		 | 2 
		 | September 29
		 | Minnesota
		 | 
		 | Diana Taurasi (21)
		 | Brittney Griner (10)
		 | Diana Taurasi (6)
		 | US Airways Center8020
		 | 0–2

Statistics

Regular season

Awards and honors

References

External links

Phoenix Mercury seasons
Phoenix
Phoenix Mercury